Teinoptera lunaki is a moth of the family Noctuidae. It is found in Yugoslavia, North Macedonia, Bulgaria and Greece.

Adults are on wing from May to June.

Subspecies
Teinoptera lunaki lunaki
Teinoptera lunaki boursini (Greece)
Teinoptera lunaki moreana (Greece)

External links
Lepiforum.de
species info

Cuculliinae
Moths of Europe